HJP may refer to:
 Hajipur Junction railway station, in India
 The Hague Justice Portal
 Hong Joon Pyo, a politician of the Republic of Korea
 Piasecki HJP, a helicopter